Tear of Thought is the second studio album released by the Australian rock band The Screaming Jets. The album was released in October 1992 and peaked at number 3 in June 1994.

Reviews
Jonathan Lewis of AllMusic gave the album 3 out 5 saying; "The Screaming Jets returned in 1992 with their second full-length album. Tear of Thought established them as stars rather than just another pub rock band. Musically, the disc continues in the vein of hard rock established by their debut, although this time the band experiments with some new musical direction, including the jazz-influenced "Helping Hand" and a faithful cover of the Boys Next Door classic, "Shivers." With enough raw power to delight fans and enough experimentation to keep critics happy, Tear of Thought was an enjoyable, but ultimately disposable, example of Australian hard rock music."

Track listing
All songs written by Paul Woseen, except where noted

Charts and certifications

Weekly charts
Tear of Thought debuted at number 20 in Australia in November 1992 and peaked at number 3 in June 1994.

Year-end charts

Certifications

Personnel
Dave Gleeson – vocals 
 Richard Lara – guitar 
 Grant Walmsley – guitar, backing vocals
 Paul Woseen - bass guitar
 Brad Heaney - drums

References

1992 albums
The Screaming Jets albums